Steve Currie (19 May 1947 – 28 April 1981) was an English musician who was best known as the bass player and a long-term member of the English glam rock band T. Rex.

While working for the local Tax office, Currie played with local Grimsby group "The Rumble Band". He joined T. Rex (recently renamed from Tyrannosaurus Rex) as bass guitarist in November 1970 (although the band were still listed as a duo) and continued to play with them until late 1976.

He appeared on all of Marc Bolan's hit singles from "Hot Love" (1971) to "Laser Love" (1976), as well as the albums Electric Warrior (1971) to Dandy in the Underworld (1977). His innovative and, for the time, sophisticated bass playing can be seen to good effect in the movie Born to Boogie.

After leaving T. Rex, he went into session work, working for Chris Spedding.

He died in a car crash on 28 April 1981, while returning to his home near Vale de Parra, Algarve, Portugal. Steve Currie is commemorated with a memorial plaque on the steps at Marc Bolan's Rock Shrine.

References

1947 births
1981 deaths
People from Grimsby
English male guitarists
Male bass guitarists
Road incident deaths in Portugal
Musicians from Lincolnshire
English session musicians
20th-century English musicians
20th-century English bass guitarists
T. Rex (band) members
20th-century British male musicians